The list of ship launches in 1681 includes a chronological list of some ships launched in 1681.


References

1681
Ship launches